Artyom Viktorovich Beketov (born 12 June 1984) is a Russian former professional footballer.

Club career
He made his debut in the Russian Premier League in 2006 for FC Luch-Energiya Vladivostok.

References

1984 births
Living people
Sportspeople from Dushanbe
Russian footballers
Association football midfielders
FC Chernomorets Novorossiysk players
FC Luch Vladivostok players
FC Salyut Belgorod players
FC Krasnodar players
FC Dynamo Bryansk players
FC Volgar Astrakhan players
FC Fakel Voronezh players
FC Armavir players
Russian Premier League players